Broyle Place is a historic house in Sussex, England. It is a Grade II listed Elizabethan manor house. In the 12th century, it belonged to Theobald, Archbishop of Canterbury. It has also been owned by Thomas Sackville, 1st Earl of Dorset and Sir Herbert Springet, 1st Baronet.

External links
  Broyle Place's website

References

Grade II listed houses
Grade II listed buildings in East Sussex
Ringmer